Noel Warren Williams (born January 23, 1972) is an American politician and insurance agent from Georgia. Williams is a Republican member of Georgia House of Representatives for District 148.

Early life 
William was born in Georgia, U.S.

Education 
In 1994, Williams earned a Political Science degree from University of Georgia.

Career 
Williams is an insurance agent.

On November 6, 2018, Williams won the election and became a Republican member of Georgia House of Representatives for District 148. Williams defeated Joshua Deriso with 69.45% of the votes. On November 3, 2020, as an incumbent, Williams won the election and continued serving District 148. Williams defeated Regina Awung with 70.95% of the votes.

Personal life 
Williams' wife is Laura Williams. They have two children. In 2002, Williams and his family returned to and live in Cordele, Georgia.

See also 
 2020 Georgia House of Representatives election

References

External links 
 Noel Williams Jr. at ballotpedia.org
 Noel Williams, Jr. at ourcampaigns.com

Republican Party members of the Georgia House of Representatives
21st-century American politicians
Insurance agents
University of Georgia alumni
Living people
1972 births